

Hermann von Nördlinger (13 August 1818 – 19 January 1897), was a German forester, botanist, and entomologist.

Nördlinger was a professor of sylviculture and Inspector of Forests at the University of Hohenheim in Württemberg. Nördlinger collaborated with a number of French botanists. From 1859 to 1870, he was editor of the forestry and hunting journal Kritische Blätter für Forst- und Jagdwissenschaft.

Publications 

 1855: Die Kleinen Feinde der Landwirthschaft.  S.G. Cotta'scher Verlag, Stuttgart
 1856:  Nachträge zu Ratzeburg's Forstinsekten.  J. Weise, Stuttgart
 1860: Die technischen Eigenschaften der Holzer fur Forst- und Baubeamte, Technologen und Gewerbtreibende. J.G. Cotta'scher Verlag. Stuttgart.

References

Further reading 

 Helmut Marcon u. a., 200 Jahre Wirtschafts- und Staatswissenschaften an der Eberhard-Karls-Universität Tübingen. Verlag Franz Steiner 2004, .

External links 
 

1818 births
1897 deaths
19th-century German botanists
German entomologists
German foresters